Stewart Wearne (21 March 1859 – 28 January 1929) was an Australian cricketer. He played three first-class matches for New South Wales between 1880/81 and 1887/88.

See also
 List of New South Wales representative cricketers

References

External links
 

1859 births
1929 deaths
Australian cricketers
New South Wales cricketers
Cricketers from Sydney